Dann Hume (born 1 September 1987) is a New Zealand musician, music producer, mix engineer and songwriter. Hume began his career with his two brothers (with Peter Hume and Jon Hume) who make up the alternative rock band, Evermore since 1999.

Biography
Dann is the youngest brother of the Hume family. In 1999 the brothers formed Evermore in Feilding. He has co-written songs for Evermore such as "Running", "Light Surrounding You" as well as the first single from Dreams, "It's Too Late". 
Soon after the release of Evermore's fourth studio album Follow the Sun in late 2012, Dann stepped away from touring with the band to focus on his music production. 

As a producer he has worked with a host of Australian artists including Lisa Mitchell, Matt Corby, Amy Shark, Alpine, Troye Sivan, Client Liaison, Snakadaktal, Sticky Fingers, Courtney Barnett, Hopium and Kita Alexander.

Lisa Mitchell's 'Wonder' achieved ARIA Platinum status, and albums reaching ARIA Gold status include Matt Corby's debut Telluric, Sticky Fingers' Caress Your Soul. Kita Alexander's Hotel, and Amy Shark's 'Weekends' achieved ARIA Platinum and Gold status, respectively. At the ARIA Music Awards of 2019, Hume won Producer of the Year for his work on Corby's album, Rainbow Valley.

Songwriting and production credits

References

1987 births
ARIA Award winners
Living people
Evermore (band) members
New Zealand musicians
People from Feilding